Natalee Caple (born 1970 in Montreal, Quebec) is a Canadian author of novels and poetry who is based at the University of Calgary where she is working on a PhD.

As a published author, her latest publication, Mackerel Sky, has enjoyed American distribution. Caple has also appeared throughout Canada at events such as the Vancouver International Writers and Readers Festival.

Bibliography
 1997: The Appetites of Tiny Hands (above/ground press)
 1998: The Heart is its own Reason (Insomniac Press) 
 1999: The Plight of Happy People in an Ordinary World (House of Anansi) 
 2000: A More Tender Ocean (Coach House Books) 
 2002: The Notebooks: Interviews and New Fiction From Young Contemporary Authors (editor, with Michelle Berry; Anchor Canada) 
 2004: Mackerel Sky (Thomas Allen) 
 U.S. hardcover issue (St Martin's Press) 
 2010: The Semiconducting Dictionary: Our Strindberg (ECW)
 2017: The Appetites of Tiny Hands: Twentieth Anniversary Edition (above/ground press)

External links
 Insomniac Press: Natalee Caple
  Vancouver International Writers and Readers Festival: Natalee Caple profile (2004)

1970 births
Living people
Canadian women poets
Canadian women novelists
Writers from Montreal
20th-century Canadian women writers
21st-century Canadian women writers
20th-century Canadian novelists
20th-century Canadian poets
21st-century Canadian novelists
21st-century Canadian poets